"Into the Lens" is a song written by Trevor Horn and Geoff Downes. It was originally released in 1980 by progressive rock band Yes, of which Horn and Downes were a part, as a part of the album Drama, before being reworked as "I Am a Camera" for the 1981 album Adventures in Modern Recording by the Buggles, a duo consisting of Horn and Downes; both versions were released as singles, with the Yes single being re-titled "Into the Lens (I Am a Camera)".

The Yes version of the song additionally credits Steve Howe, Chris Squire, and Alan White as co-songwriters; all of the songs on Drama were credited to the entire band.

Development

The first version of the song was a demo, recorded on a Sunday afternoon when songwriters Trevor Horn and Geoff Downes started working on the second Buggles album in 1980. When they joined Yes, it gained input from other members Steve Howe, Chris Squire and Alan White, and therefore, "Into the Lens" features a more distinctive "prog rock" sound.

When Horn and Downes resumed work on the Buggles album which would become Adventures in Modern Recording, the song was reworked as "I Am a Camera". Trevor Horn said about the two versions:

The song "I Am a Camera" was a Buggles track and we had adapted it into a Yes track. It became "Into the Lens" and, naturally, slightly more overblown. I don't mind "Into the Lens"—the melody's unadulterated while the arrangement's a lot more complicated—but I still prefer The Buggles version. I think Geoffrey's brilliant on the Buggles version.

Version history and releases
Along with the "On TV" and "Lenny" singles, the Buggles' "I Am a Camera" was re-released by ZTT on iTunes in 2012, including three bonus tracks: the aforementioned "12" Mix" of the song, and two demos both titled "We Can Fly from Here" ("Part I" and "Part II" respectively). The latter two songs would (like the "I Am a Camera" demo) be reworked as Yes songs, and in fact become the basis of Yes' future album, 2011's Fly from Here, which would mark the second time that both Horn and Downes would work with Yes following a departure by Jon Anderson - Downes returning on keyboards for both the album and the tour, but Horn taking the role as producer and offering some backing vocals, but reserving lead vocals for Benoît David. Along with the "12" mix", the B-side, and the two demos also appear on ZTT's 2010 re-release of Adventures in Modern Recording.

In the Netherlands, the Buggles version originally peaked on the Single Top 100 at #46,
but reached #11 on the Dutch Top 40.

Yes' version of the song was also released as a single, although significantly shortened from the original album version. The single was released under the title "Into the Lens (I Am a Camera)" 

In 1985, "I Am a Camera" was covered by Kim Carnes as a bonus track on her album Barking at Airplanes. In a 2020 interview, Carnes admitted that she was unhappy with her performance of the song.

Reception
Record World called it a "playful pop-rocker" with "sweetly affecting" harmonies and keyboards.

Music video
In the music video made for "I Am a Camera", during the beginning, there are a pair of Horn's trademark glasses. On one of the lenses is a video and the other is glass. Horn comes out of the video side of the glasses (as illustrated). There are scenes involving Horn singing, broken glasses and opticians' tools. The video is seemingly set in a dollhouse. Towards the end, Horn is seen lying on the floor passed out. On 22 March 2013, Classic Pop Magazine rated the music video a "Classic Video".

Personnel

Yes version
 Trevor Horn – lead vocals
 Geoff Downes – keyboards, vocoder
 Steve Howe – Fender Console Steel and Telecaster
 Chris Squire – bass, backing vocals
 Alan White – drums, percussion

Buggles version of "I am a Camera"
 Geoff Downes – keyboards, vocoder
 Trevor Horn – vocals, guitar, drum programming, production

Other 
Since 1982, a few bars from the song are used as a jingle of "music premiere" at Polskie Radio Program III (Polish Radio Three) and as a jingle to announce a new song on their chart, Lista Przebojów Programu Trzeciego.

References

External links
 

Yes (band) songs
The Buggles songs
1980 songs
Songs written by Trevor Horn
Songs written by Geoff Downes
Songs written by Chris Squire
Songs written by Steve Howe (musician)
Carrere Records singles
Atlantic Records singles